The 2016 Tevlin Women's Challenger was a professional tennis tournament played on indoor hard courts. It was the 12th edition of the tournament and part of the 2016 ITF Women's Circuit, offering a total of $50,000 in prize money. It took place in Toronto, Ontario, Canada between October 31 and November 6, 2016.

Singles main-draw entrants

Seeds

1 Rankings are as of October 24, 2016

Other entrants
The following players received wildcards into the singles main draw:
 Carson Branstine
 Gabriela Dabrowski
 Charlotte Robillard-Millette
 Layne Sleeth

The following players received entry from the qualifying draw:
 Emina Bektas
 Julia Elbaba
 Katherine Sebov
 Ronit Yurovsky

The following player received entry by junior exempt:
 Bianca Andreescu

Champions

Singles

 Catherine Bellis def.  Jesika Malečková, 6–2, 1–6, 6–3

Doubles

 Gabriela Dabrowski /  Michaëlla Krajicek def.  Ashley Weinhold /  Caitlin Whoriskey, 6–4, 6–3

External links
Official website

Tevlin Women's Challenger
Tevlin Women's Challenger
Tevlin Women's Challenger